LandCorp was an agency of the Government of Western Australia. It was responsible for releasing land for residential and commercial development throughout Western Australia.

LandCorp was established on 1 September 1992, pursuant to the Western Australian Land Authority Act 1992 when the Industrial Lands Development Authority and Joondalup Development Corporation merged. In 2019 it merged with the Metropolitan Redevelopment Authority to form DevelopmentWA.

References

Statutory agencies of Western Australia
Urban development authorities
1992 establishments in Australia
2019 disestablishments in Australia